The bulboid corpuscles (end-bulbs of Krause) are cutaneous receptors in the human body.

The end-bulbs of Krause were named after the German anatomist Wilhelm Krause (1833–1910).

Function
The end-bulbs of Krause were thought to be thermoreceptors, sensing cold temperatures, but their function is unknown.

Structure
They are minute cylindrical or oval bodies, consisting of a capsule formed by the expansion of the connective-tissue sheath of a medullated fiber, and containing a soft semifluid core in which the axis-cylinder terminates either in a bulbous extremity or in a coiled-up plexiform mass.

Location
End-bulbs are found in the conjunctiva of the eye (where they are spheroidal in shape in humans, but cylindrical in most other animals), in the mucous membrane of the lips and tongue, and in the epineurium of nerve trunks.

They are also found in the penis and the clitoris and have received the name of genital corpuscles; in these situations they have a mulberry-like appearance, being constricted by connective-tissue septa into from two to six knob-like masses.

In the synovial membranes of certain joints, e. g., those of the fingers, rounded or oval end-bulbs occur, and are designated articular end-bulbs.

References

External links
 Description at cirp.org

Sensory receptors